Another Late Night: Tommy Guerrero is a DJ mix album, mixed by musician and former professional skateboarder, Tommy Guerrero. It was released as part of the Late Night Tales / Another Late Night DJ series.

Track listing
"Can't Get Up If You Can't Get Down" - US Navy Port Authority Soul Band
"Tomcat" - Muddy Waters
"Slippin' into Darkness" - Ramsey Lewis
"Taboo" - Santana
"Funky" - The Chambers Brothers
"Same Brown Earth" - Latin Playboys
"I'm Her Daddy" - Bill Withers
"Funkiest Man Alive" - Rufus Thomas
"Euphrates" - The Main Ingredient
"One More Time" - Cymande
"Web" - Hampton Hawes
"Viva Tirado" - El Chicano
"Is It Because I'm Black" - Syl Johnson
"Vitamin C" - Can
"Summer Song" - Ronnie Foster
"Come Together" - Tommy Guerrero
"Peepshow, Pts. 2 & 3" (read by Sir Patrick Moore, written by Nick Walker)

References

External links
 Late Night Tales: Tommy Guerrero

Guerrero, Tommy
2002 compilation albums